Zwinge is a village and a former municipality in the district of Eichsfeld in Thuringia, Germany. Since 1 December 2011, it is part of the municipality Sonnenstein, of which it is an Ortschaft.

References

Former municipalities in Thuringia
Sonnenstein, Thuringia